Corey Baker may refer to:
 Corey Baker (baseball) (born 1989), Israeli-American baseball player
 Corey Baker (choreographer) (born 1991, New Zealand choreographer